Jean-Jacques Debout (born 9 March 1940, in Paris) is a French singer-songwriter. In addition to his albums, he has written for a number of renowned artists like Johnny Hallyday, Sylvie Vartan, Dalida, and Chantal Goya. He has also composed a great number of films.

Personal life
He is married to French singer and actress Chantal Goya. They have two children, Jean-Paul and Clarisse.

Discography
1965: Les boutons dorés
1967: Les cloches d'Ecosse
1974: Redeviens Virginie
1976: Si tu reviens
1989: Depuis 1959... Avec toi
1991: Paul et Virginie
1996: Best of
1997: A Long Island
2003: Les Enfants du Paradis
2012: Bourlingueur des étoiles
2013: Sous le soleil des Guinguettes (peaked in FR: #14, BEL (Wa): #87)
2014: Sur le chemin du bonheur

Filmography

1962: The Dance
1963: D'où viens-tu Johnny?
1964: Cherchez l'idole as himself
2009: Partir as Paul Marais

soundtracks
1963: D'où viens-tu Johnny?
1966: Masculin, féminin
1971: L'amour c'est gai, l'amour c'est triste
1979: Le temps des vacances
1983: Les parents ne sont pas simples cette année
2001: Absolument fabuleux
2004: Michel Strogoff
2010: Gigola
Themes of TV series and TV films
1972: Églantine
1979: Les malheurs de Sophie
1980: Les Misérables
1980: Capitaine Flam
1981: Bouba, le petit ourson
1984: Les Trois Mousquetaires
1984: Les quatre filles du docteur March
1987: David le gnome
1998: Michel Strogoff
2001: Conan, le fils du futur

References

French male singers
French songwriters
Male songwriters
1940 births
Living people
Singers from Paris